Paoli is a Statutory Town in Phillips County, Colorado, United States. The population was 34 according to the 2010 census.

Description
A post office called Paoli has been in operation since 1888.  The community was named after Paoli, Pennsylvania.

Geography
Paoli is located at  (40.612120, -102.472868).

Demographics

As of the census of 2000, there were 17 people, 19 households, and 12 families residing in the town. The racial makeup of the town was 100.00% White.

There were 19 households, out of which 4 had children under the age of 18 living with them, 10 were married couples living together, 1 had a female householder with no husband present, and 7 were non-families. 6 were made up of individuals, and 2 had someone living alone who was 65 years of age or older. The average household size was 2.21 and the average family size was 2.83.

In the town, the population was spread out, with 21.4% under the age of 18, 14.3% from 25 to 44, 35.7% from 45 to 64, and 28.6% who were 65 years of age or older. The median age was 50 years. For every 100 females, there were 121.1 males. For every 100 females age 18 and over, there were 94.1 males.

The median income for a household in the town was $32,500, and the median income for a family was $33,750. Males had a median income of $22,917 versus $40,625 for females. The per capita income for the town was $14,947. There were 30.0% of families and 18.6% of the population living below the poverty line, including no under eighteens and none of those over 64.

See also

 List of municipalities in Colorado

References

External links

 CDOT map of the Town of Paoli

Towns in Phillips County, Colorado
Towns in Colorado